Kramer (AKA Kramer Junction) is an unincorporated community in San Bernardino County, California, United States.

For many years, motorists have been frustrated at the long delays at the Kramer Junction stoplight, which interrupted the flow of traffic on CA-58. This issue was largely resolved by June 2020 with completion of the Kramer Junction bypass.

References

Unincorporated communities in San Bernardino County, California
Unincorporated communities in California